Alagappa is a given name. Notable people with the name include:

Alagappa Alagappan (1925–2014), Indian-born American founder of the Hindu Temple Society of North America
Alagappa Chettiar (1909–1957), Indian businessman and philanthropist